The 2021 Bloeizone Fryslân Tour was a women's cycle stage race that was held in the Netherlands from 10 to 12 March 2021. The 2021 edition of the race was the tenth running of the Healthy Ageing Tour, being held with a UCI rating of 2.1.

Teams 
Five UCI Women's WorldTeams, twelve UCI Women's Continental Teams and six Dutch cycling clubs made up the twentythree teams that participated in the race. Only the NWV Groningen and  did not enter the maximum of six riders, as they each entered five. 130 riders started the race, of which 109 finished.

UCI Women's WorldTeams

 
 
 
 
 

UCI Women's Continental Teams

 
 
 
 
 
 
 
 
 
 
 St Michel - Auber93
 

Cycling clubs

 GRC Jan van Arckel
 NWV Groningen
 Team Drenthe
 WV Schijndel
 Watersley Race & Development CT
 Restore Cycling

Route

Stages

Stage 1 
3 March 2022 — Surhuisterveen to Surhuisterveen,

Stage 2 
4 March 2022 — Eastermar to Bakkeveen,

Stage 3 
5 March 2022 — Drachten to Drachten,

Final classification standings

General classification

Points classification

Young rider classification

Team classification

See also 
 2022 in women's road cycling

References 

2022
Healthy Ageing Tour
Healthy Ageing Tour
Bloeizone Fryslân Tour